Roger Browning is a former Australian rules footballer who played in Tasmania between 1960 and 1964 and also represented the state several times in interstate matches. He was inducted into the Tasmanian Football Hall of Fame in 2012.

Browning played for New Norfolk in the Tasmanian Football League (TFL).

References

New Norfolk Football Club players
Australian rules footballers from Tasmania
Tasmanian Football Hall of Fame inductees
Living people
Year of birth missing (living people)